Puget is an unincorporated community in Thurston County, in the U.S. state of Washington. The area is located on the Johnson Point peninsula overlooking Nisqually Reach.

History
Puget was platted in 1873, but an economic downturn in 1893 stunted growth. A post office named Puget City began in 1890, but was shuttered in 1893; a newly-renamed post office named Puget opened in 1904, and closed permanently in 1928.

Parks and recreation
The community is near Tolmie State Park and the Nisqually National Wildlife Refuge.

References

Unincorporated communities in Thurston County, Washington